Planet of Dinosaurs is a 1977 science fiction film. Set in an unspecified future, the film follows the journey of Captain Lee and his crew after they crash land on a planet with similar life conditions as Earth, but millions of years behind in time. Encountering a wide variety of dangerous dinosaurs, the crew decides that its best chance for survival lies on finding higher ground and setting up a defensive perimeter on a higher plateau for refuge to wait for when (or if) their rescuers arrive. They soon encounter a deadly Tyrannosaurus and must figure out a way to defeat the creature and survive on the planet.

The film's director, James K. Shea, instructed most of the budget to be spent on the special effects for the film, which included an array of award-winning stop motion dinosaurs, leaving little money for props or even to pay the main actors. James Whitworth and Max Thayer had the most film experience of the actors. Modern reviews have generally been negative, although there is agreement that the stop motion dinosaurs were the most notable and enjoyable aspect of the film.

Plot
After a mechanical failure aboard the spaceship Odyssey, Captain Lee Norsythe (Louie Lawless) is forced to crash land on a planet with atmosphere and conditions much like that of Earth, although it is many light-years away. As the ship sinks into the lake that it landed in, communications officer Cindy (Mary Appleseth) realizes that she forgot the radio in the ship and attempts to retrieve it, with the assistance of fellow crew-member Chuck (Chuck Pennington). En route, Cindy is attacked and killed by an unidentified aquatic creature, prompting Chuck to return to shore without the radio.

Realizing that they are stranded, the remaining eight people aboard the ship decide that survival is their primary goal and begin to explore the planet that they have landed on. Derna Lee (Derna Wylde) slips while going through a swamp, dropping the laser gun that Mike (Max Thayer) had given her in the water and rendering the gun unusable. They eventually come across a Brontosaurus, which leads them to deduce that the planet is following a similar evolutionary track as the one on Earth, but is millions of years younger. Later, Charlotte (Charlotte Speer) determines that the plant life, especially the berries, is poisonous. After another dinosaur encounter, Lee decides that the best option is to climb up the mountains and reach a higher plateau, where he believes the large creatures will be unable to reach them.

During the ascent, Nyla (Pamela Bottaro) slips and loses the entire supply of food rations, which Lee refuses to retrieve. Near a cave higher up in the mountains, Vice-President of Spaceways Incorporated Harvey Baylor (Harvey Shain) discovers a nest full of eggs. After stealing an egg, Harvey is attacked and killed by a Centrosaurus. Soon after, much to ship engineer Jim's (James Whitworth) dismay, Lee decides to halt the expedition and settle at what he considers to be a defensible area. Lee expects to hold out until they are rescued, but Jim believes them to be trapped forever on the planet, and advises that they begin a new civilization. Lee triumphs and the remaining crew begin to build a defensive stockade around a cave. After several more encounters, a large Tyrannosaurus arrives and kills Derna, demolishing the stockade in the process.

The crew finally agrees with Jim that the best way to survive is to kill the predator. Their first plan, devised by Lee, is to attempt to poison the dinosaur by smearing poison from the berries on a dead Polacanthus and leave it outside of the Tyrannosaurus lair. The plan backfires when the beast attacks from behind, killing Mike. Jim's plan is to set up large, wooden stakes and coat them in the poison, then lure the predator into them to be impaled. After some initial troubles the plan works, killing the Tyrannosaurus. Years pass and the survivors have set up an agricultural settlement. Chuck and Charlotte now have a son named Mikey. Charlotte wonders aloud if they will ever be rescued, to which Nyla comments that it does not seem important anymore.

Cast

Production
Most of Planet of Dinosaurs budget went towards the special effects, particularly the stop motion dinosaurs. Included among the dinosaurs was a model that paid homage to Ray Harryhausen's Rhedosaurus from The Beast from 20,000 Fathoms. Since most of the budget had been spent creating the stop motion effects, all of the actors had to sign partial deferments for their contracts and at least one actress (Derna Wylde) claims that she never received the balance of what was owed to her. In addition, the low budget was reflected in many of the props. The "fermented berry juice" used in the film was grape Kool-Aid, but it tasted "like liquid cardboard." Filming took place in the Vasquez Rocks area of California's desert, in an area previously used to film several episodes of Star Trek.

Planet of Dinosaurs did not have a theatrical release. The film is registered as copyright to Deathbeast Productions in the United States Copyright Office database. Works published after 1978 do not need a copyright notice displayed to be considered copyrighted, so long as there is a registration in the Copyright Office database.

Reception
The film won the 1980 Saturn Award, presented by the Academy of Science Fiction, Fantasy & Horror Films, in the "Best Film Produced for Under $1,000,000" category, taking specific note of its stop motion effects. The film was first released on DVD in 2001 and again by Retromedia Entertainment on September 25, 2007 as a "30th Anniversary Edition" in widescreen format that was initially mislabeled as the "20th Anniversary Edition". The latter contains bonus features, while the former does not.

Reviews of the film were negative, with a particular focus on the acting, dialogue, and overall aesthetic, although the stop motion dinosaurs were generally praised. When the film was released with a RiffTrax audio commentary in 2010, Steven Biodrowski of Cinefantastique reviewed the movie and called it "pure 1970s camp", but claimed that the dinosaurs "are fun to watch in a nostalgic kind of way". Both Allmovie and TV Guide gave it 2 stars out of 5. The film maintains a rating of 4.2 out of 10 on the Internet Movie Database as of October 2017.

References

External links
 

1977 films
Space adventure films
Giant monster films
Films about dinosaurs
1970s stop-motion animated films
1970s science fiction films
Films about extraterrestrial life
American science fiction films
Films set on fictional planets
1970s English-language films
1970s American films